The Belmont Hotel  was an early 20th-century skyscraper-like hotel at Park Avenue and 42nd Street in Midtown Manhattan, New York City. The Belmont Hotel was built between 1904 and 1908. At , it was the tallest hotel in the world when built and was demolished in 1939. The 42nd Street Airlines Terminal was built in its place.

Sources 
 Emporis.com
 

42nd Street (Manhattan)
Buildings and structures demolished in 1939
Defunct hotels in Manhattan
Bowman-Biltmore Hotels
Hotel buildings completed in 1908
Hotels established in 1908
Hotels in Manhattan
Midtown Manhattan
Park Avenue